The Clear Springs Tabernacle is a historic church revival building at the junction of Arkansas Highway 26 and Bobo Road, northeast of Antoine in rural Clark County, Arkansas.  It is an open-air wood-frame structure with a metal roof, built in 1887 by the Christian Camp Ground Association.  It is one of the few religious revival buildings of the period to survive in the state.

The building was listed on the National Register of Historic Places in 1992.

See also
National Register of Historic Places listings in Clark County, Arkansas

References

Churches on the National Register of Historic Places in Arkansas
Buildings and structures in Clark County, Arkansas
Churches in Arkansas
National Register of Historic Places in Clark County, Arkansas